Esther is a play in three acts written in 1689 by the French dramatist, Jean Racine.  It was premièred on January 26, 1689, performed by the pupils of the Maison royale de Saint-Louis, an educational institute for young girls of noble birth. The subject is taken from the biblical Book of Esther.

Esther remains one of Racine's lesser known works as it has only three instead of the classical five acts. It dates from the last period of his career when he entered government work and was requested by Madame de Maintenon to return to liturgical drama. It is often negatively compared to Racine's 1691 biblical play written for Maintenon, Athalie.

Later reception 
From the 1876 translation of Caroline Andrews:
	In the reign of Louis XIV, a seminary for young ladies was founded at St. Cyr, at the persuasion of Madame Maintenon, who gave her entire attention to the education of 250 noble young ladies; who were educated free of expense until their 20th year.  Racine was requested to compose a poem suitable for their instruction and amusement, and he proposed the subject of Esther; which he dramatized to the satisfaction of teachers and pupils, and which they declaimed and chanted with so much grace and modesty, that this little drama, intended only for the benefit of young pupils, became the admiration of king and court.  Grand lords saw and applauded.
	As the translator has followed closely the original, she hopes to recommend the same to the attention of lady educators.  And knowing that the Jews in the celebration of their Purim always read the book of Esther, it is thought the rehearsal of this drama might make a deeper impression on the minds of their youth and contribute to their entertainment.

Testimonial:
	The following testimonial from Rabbi Wise of Cincinnati, Ohio: "The English version of Esther by Mrs. Andrews is a masterpiece in my estimation, full of magnificent gems and faithful to the original."

List of characters 
Ahasuerus, King of Persia
Esther, Queen of Persia
Mordecai, Uncle to Esther
Haman, Favorite of Ahasuerus
Zeresh, Wife of Haman
Hydaspes, Officer in the King's Palace
Asaph, another Officer of the King
Elise, a Confidante of Esther
Tamar, of the Suite of Esther
Guards, of King Ahasuerus
Chorus, of Israelite Maidens

See also 
 Ad usum Delphini

References 
 Andrews, Caroline, trans.  Esther: a Drama  Philadelphia, 1876
 Jean Racine (1639-1699) Theater Database, Oct. 20 2007 <http://www.theatredatabase.com/17th_century/jean_racine_001.html>.
 Esther 
 Esther, a tragedy adapted and partially translated from the French of Jean Racine 

1689 plays
Cultural depictions of Esther
Plays by Jean Racine
Plays based on the Bible